Salvia cavaleriei is an herb that is native to Guangdong, Guangxi, Guizhou, Hubei, Hunan, Jiangxi, Shaanxi, Sichuan, and Yunnan provinces in China, growing in forests, on hillsides, and streamsides at  elevation.

There are three named varieties. In addition to variation in leaf shape and size, they have the following flower colors:
S.  cavaleriei var. cavaleriei is blue-purple or purple.
S.  cavaleriei var. erythrophylla is dark purple or white.
S.  cavaleriei var. simplicifolia is purple or purple-red.

References

cavaleriei
Flora of China